Rawmarsh Community School is a coeducational secondary school with academy status located in Rotherham, South Yorkshire, England.

Ofsted inspections
Since the commencement of Ofsted inspections in September 1993, the school has undergone many inspections.

Ofsted reports rated Rawmarsh Community School as Grade 4 (Inadequate) for overall effectiveness in 2007, Grade 3 (Satisfactory) in 2008 and 2011, and Grade 4 in 2013. The school was placed in Special measures in 2013. Based on the 2017 inspection, Ofsted now rates Rawmarsh Community School as a Grade 2 (Good) School.

Headteachers

 1966–1987 – Pat Laing
 1987-1998 – Tony Evans 
 1998–2010 – John Lambert 
 2010–2013 – Mr G Wilson
 2013–present – David Hudson OBE (Executive Headteacher)
 2013–present – Mrs Helen O’Brien (Headteacher)

Media
In September 2006 Jamie Oliver and Rawmarsh Community School were the subject of newspaper reports after a group of parents objected to Oliver's "healthy school dinners" scheme, in which pupils on site were fed 'healthy options' during school lunchtime pupil lock-ins. Some parents took orders over the school fence for nearby sandwich and fast-food outlets. The food was then delivered over the fence to waiting pupils.

References

External links
 Rawmarsh Community School

Secondary schools in Rotherham
Academies in Rotherham